Serra San Bruno is a comune (municipality) in the Province of Vibo Valentia in the Italian region Calabria, located about  southwest of Catanzaro and about  southeast of Vibo Valentia.

Close by is the famous Carthusian monastery, Serra San Bruno Charterhouse (Certosa di Santo Stefano di Serra San Bruno), around which the town grew up. The town is named after Saint Bruno of Cologne, who founded the Carthusian Order in 1053 and the Grande Chartreuse, mother house of the Carthusians, near Grenoble, in France. He built the charterhouse of Serra San Bruno in 1095, and died here in 1101.

The municipality of Serra San Bruno contains the frazione (subdivision) Ninfo.

Serra San Bruno borders the following municipalities: Arena, Gerocarne, Mongiana, Spadola, Brognaturo, Simbario, Stilo.

The movie Le Quattro Volte was filmed in this town.

Demographic evolution

References

External links
 www.comune.serrasanbruno.vv.it/
 

Cities and towns in Calabria